Euthemis leucocarpa is a plant in the family Ochnaceae. The specific epithet  is from the Greek meaning "white fruit".

Description

Distribution and habitat
Euthemis leucocarpa grows naturally in Cambodia, Sumatra, Peninsular Malaysia and Borneo. Its habitat is lowland to submontane forests, including peat swamp and kerangas forests, from sea-level to  altitude.

References

Ochnaceae
Flora of Cambodia
Flora of Sumatra
Flora of Peninsular Malaysia
Flora of Borneo